Kara Thomas (born Kara Mustafa, March 21, 1990), is an American author of novels for young adults and television writer best known for her 2018 novel The Cheerleaders

Biography 

Kara Thomas is an American author of young adult fiction. Raised on Long Island, New York, Kara attended Stony Brook University and graduated with a degree in English. She wrote Prep School Confidential during her final year at Stony Brook. In July 2013, she signed a blind-script deal for a television pilot with Warner Brothers TV (Untitled Kara Taylor Project). In August 2013 it was announced that Rashida Jones and Will McCormack are developing Taylor's dramedy The Revengers for the CW, for which Taylor will serve as writer and co-executive producer.

Thomas currently lives on Long Island.

Works

As Kara Taylor
Prep School Confidential (St. Martin's Press/Thomas Dunne Books, July 30, 2013)
Wicked Little Secrets (St. Martin's Press/Thomas Dunne Books, March 4, 2014)
Deadly Little Sins (St. Martin's Press/Thomas Dunne Books, August 5, 2014)

As Kara Thomas
The Darkest Corners, Delacorte Press, 2016, 
Little Monsters, Delacorte Press, 2017, 
The Cheerleaders, Delacorte Press, 2018, 
That Weekend, Delacorte Press, 2021,

References

External links 

 Author Website
 Random House Page

American women novelists
American young adult novelists
American television writers
1990 births
Living people
Women writers of young adult literature
American women television writers
21st-century American women